Dimension 404 is an American science fiction black comedy anthology series created by Desmond "Dez" Dolly and Will Campos, and co-created by Dan Johnson and David Welch. It began airing on April 4, 2017, on the streaming service Hulu. The series is produced by RocketJump and Lionsgate Television, with each episode being its own self-contained television film. The series is heavily inspired by The Twilight Zone and The Outer Limits. Its name is taken from the 1950s radio program Dimension X with 404 added on the end to signify its content is based on the internet generation. The number 404 is a reference to the HTTP status code signifying an error due to a webpage not being found.

Cast and characters
 Mark Hamill as the Narrator

Episode 1: "Matchmaker"
 Robert Buckley as Adam
 Lea Michele as Amanda
 Matt Jones as Greg
 Joel McHale as Dr. Matthew Maker
 Karissa Lee Staples as Becky
 Catherine Garcia as Cate
 Mario Garcia as Mario

Episode 2: "Cinethrax"
 Sarah Hyland as Chloe
 Daniel Zovatto as Zach
 Patton Oswalt as Uncle Dusty
 Casimere Jolette as Brie
 Ashly Burch as Shannon
 Tom Plumley as Concession Stand Teen
 Sean Przano as Cosplay Nerd
 Joey Scoma as Arnie
 CC Weske as Alexis

Episode 3: "Chronos"
 Ashley Rickards as Susan Hirsch
 Anthony Oh (Stunt person) as Lord Entropy
 Utkarsh Ambudkar as Alex Kapour
 Parry Shen as Unnamed Animator
 Charles Fleischer as Professor Dobkin
 Pepe Serna as Wally Nash
 Matthew Del Negro as Time Ryder
 Julie Dove as Julie Hirsch
 LaLa Nestor as Young Sue Hirsch
 James Babson as Guard #1
 Anthony Alabi as Guard #2

Episode 4: "Polybius"
 Ryan Lee as Andrew Meyers
 Sterling Beaumon as Jess
 as Amy
 Ken Foree as Agent X
 Tucker Albrizzi as Dennis
 Adrienne Barbeau as Wilma
 Davis Desmond as Melvin Raimi
 Travis Myers as Coach Wurgler
 Douglas Tait as Polybius Creature
 Chris Wylde as Detective

Episode 5: "Bob"
 Tom Noonan as Bob
 Megan Mullally as Director Stevens
 Constance Wu as Jane
 Malcolm Barrett as Chris
 Melanie Thompson as Beth
 Chase Williamson as Private Adams

Episode 6: "Impulse"
 Lorenza Izzo as Val Hernandez / "Speedrun"
 Kenneth Choi as Kojima
 Matt Lauria as Evan
 Cody Johns as Roy Torvald / "Killohertz"
 Jimmy Wong as Commentator
 Noah Segan as Charlie

Production

Development
The six-episode anthology was ordered to series at Hulu in February 2016, with Dolly taking on the role of showrunner. Freddie Wong, Matthew Arnold, and Dolly were also reported to serve as executive producers on the series, as well as undertaking directing duties for individual episodes. Each episode was planned to be an hour in length, and tell individual stories.

Casting
On June 8, 2016, it was announced that Lea Michele and Robert Buckley would headline the first episode of the series, and Ryan Lee would take the lead role in a different and unrelated episode. On June 14, 2016, Joel McHale joined the cast to star alongside Michele and Buckley in the first episode, and Sarah Hyland was cast in a leading role in a separate episode. That same month, Patton Oswalt joined to star alongside Hyland, Ashley Rickards was cast to lead a separate episode, and Sterling Beaumon joined to co-star opposite Lee. That same month, Megan Mullally and Constance Wu were cast to appear in the same episode. In July 2016, Lorenza Izzo, Daniel Zovatto, and Tom Noonan joined the cast of the series, with Izzo appearing in a separate episode, Zovatto appearing opposite Hyland, and Noonan appearing opposite Wu and Mullally. On March 21, 2017, it was announced that Mark Hamill narrates the series.

Filming
Filming for the series began in June 2016.

Episodes

References

External links
 
 

2017 American television series debuts
2017 American television series endings
2010s American drama television series
2010s American science fiction television series
English-language television shows
Television series by Lionsgate Television
Science fiction anthology television series